The following is a list of ESPN College Basketball personalities, as appearing in games broadcast on ABC, ESPN, ESPN2, and ESPNU. Keep in mind these are only weekly regular season pairings for college basketball.

Present

Play-by-play

Roxy Bernstein
Kevin Brown
Kevin Calabro
Ed Cohen
Mike Corey
Mike Couzens
Brian Custer
Rece Davis
Dave Flemming
Rich Hollenberg
Mitch Holthus
Mark Jones
Sean McDonough
Beth Mowins
Mark Neely
Dave O'Brien
Dave Pasch
Bob Picozzi
Karl Ravech
Ryan Ruocco
Jon Sciambi
Doug Sherman
Dan Shulman
Pam Ward
Bob Wischusen

Color commentators

Mark Adams
Cory Alexander
Jon Barry
Jay Bilas
Caron Butler
PJ Carlesimo
Jon Crispin
Jimmy Dykes
LaPhonso Ellis
Sean Farnham
Fran Fraschilla
Seth Greenberg
Mark Jackson
Richard Jefferson
Jeff Van Gundy
Dick Vitale
Bill Walton
Tim Welsh
Corey Williams

Sideline reporters
Malika Andrews
Doris Burke
Kris Budden
Israel Gutierrez
Cassidy Hubbarth
Molly McGrath
Holly Rowe
Laura Rutledge
Adam Schefter
Lisa Salters
Jorge Sedano
Brooke Weisbrod

Studio hosts
Chris Cotter
Rece Davis
Karl Ravech

Studio analysts
Jay Bilas
Seth Greenberg
Kendrick Perkins
Jalen Rose
Adrian Wojnarowski

Past

Play-by-play

Adam Amin
Dave Barnett
Jason Benetti
Len Berman
Allen Bestwick
Carter Blackburn
Bob Carpenter
Eric Collins
Ron Franklin
Terry Gannon
Mike Gorman
Scott Graham
Tom Hammond
Frank Herzog
Mick Hubert
Jim Kelly
Wayne Larrivee
Brent Musburger
Brad Nessler
Mike Patrick
Jerry Punch
Bill O'Donnell
Bob Rathbun
Dave Revsine
Michael Reghi
Ted Robinson
John Rooney
John Saunders
Jim Simpson
Phil Stone
Joe Tessitore
Mike Tirico
Barry Tompkins
Gary Thorne
Fred White

Color commentators

Stephen Bardo
Chauncey Billups
Dan Bonner
Quinn Buckner
Jim Chones
Hubert Davis
Joe Dean
Len Elmore
Larry Farmer
Dino Gaudio
Dave Gavitt
Jack Givens
Michael Holton
Mike Jarvis
Clark Kellogg
Bob Knight
Bruce Larson
Steve Lavin
Nancy Lieberman
Tim McCormick
Rick Majerus
Jeff Mullins
Bob Ortegel
Ted Owens
Bill Raftery
Mike Rice
Dave Ryan 
Jon Sundvold
Gary Thompson
Lynn Shackelford
Bucky Waters
Bob Wenzel

Sideline reporters
Erin Andrews
Thea Andrews
Heather Cox
Stacey Dales
Jeannine Edwards
Allen Hopkins
Andy Katz
Samantha Ponder
Shannon Spake
Maria Taylor
Allison Williams

Studio hosts
Tim Brando
Chris Fowler
Bob Ley
Rachel Nichols
Mike Tirico
Scott Reiss
John Saunders
Adnan Virk

Studio analysts
Chauncey Billups
Tom Brennan
Caron Butler
Pat Forde
Bob Knight
Steve Lavin
Digger Phelps
Paul Pierce

References

ESPN College Basketbal personalities
Personalities
ESPN College Basketball Personalities